The UK Shadow Cabinet (see also Official Opposition Shadow Cabinet (United Kingdom)) was appointed by Conservative Party leader Iain Duncan Smith.  Following his initial appointments in September 2001 Smith managed three reshuffles before his resignation as leader in November 2003.

IDS Shadow Cabinet, 14 September 2001
Rt. Hon. Iain Duncan Smith MP — Leader of Her Majesty's Loyal Opposition and Leader of the Conservative Party
Rt. Hon. Michael Ancram QC MP — Deputy Leader of the Conservative Party and Shadow Secretary of State for Foreign and Commonwealth Affairs
Rt. Hon. Michael Howard QC MP — Shadow Chancellor of the Exchequer
Rt. Hon. Oliver Letwin MP — Shadow Secretary of State for the Home Department
Rt. Hon. David Davis MP — Chairman of the Conservative Party and Shadow Minister without Portfolio
Rt. Hon. Thomas Galbraith, Lord Strathclyde PC — Shadow Leader of the House of Lords
Rt. Hon. Eric Forth MP — Shadow Leader of the House of Commons and Shadow Chancellor of the Duchy of Lancaster
Hon. Bernard Jenkin MP — Shadow Secretary of State for Defence
David Willetts MP — Shadow Secretary of State for Work and Pensions
Dr. Liam Fox MP — Shadow Secretary of State for Health
Peter Ainsworth MP — Shadow Secretary of State for Environment, Food and Rural Affairs
Tim Yeo MP — Shadow Secretary of State for Culture, Media and Sport
Rt. Hon. Theresa May MP — Shadow Secretary of State for Transport, Local Government and the Regions
Quentin Davies MP — Shadow Secretary of State for Northern Ireland
John Whittingdale MP — Shadow Secretary of State for Trade and Industry
Damian Green MP — Shadow Secretary of State for Education and Skills
John Bercow MP — Shadow Chief Secretary to the Treasury
Jacqui Lait MP — Shadow Secretary of State for Scotland
Nigel Evans MP — Shadow Secretary of State for Wales
Caroline Spelman MP — Shadow Secretary of State for International Development
Rt. Hon. David Maclean MP — Opposition Chief Whip
Rt. Hon. John Cope, Lord Cope of Berkeley PC — Opposition Lords Chief Whip

Junior Shadow Ministers
Tim Collins CBE MP — Shadow Cabinet Office Minister
Eric Pickles MP — Shadow Transport Minister
Ann Winterton MP — Shadow Rural Affairs Minister
James Clappison MP — Shadow Work Minister
Bill Cash MP — Attorney General
Christopher Prout, Lord Kingsland QC — Shadow Lord Chancellor

IDS Shadow Cabinet reshuffle, 3 May 2002
There was a minor reshuffle of the Shadow Cabinet due to the sacking of Ann Winterton as Shadow Rural Affairs Minister. Ann Winterton was sacked due to a racist speech at a rugby club, claiming that 'Pakis' were '10 a penny'. Winterton refused to resign, and was therefore sacked by IDS.

Shadow Cabinet
Rt. Hon. Iain Duncan Smith MP — Leader of Her Majesty's Loyal Opposition and Leader of the Conservative Party
Rt. Hon. Michael Ancram QC MP — Deputy Leader of the Conservative Party and Shadow Secretary of State for Foreign and Commonwealth Affairs
Rt. Hon. Michael Howard QC MP — Shadow Chancellor of the Exchequer
Rt. Hon. Oliver Letwin MP — Shadow Secretary of State for the Home Department
Rt. Hon. David Davis MP — Chairman of the Conservative Party and Shadow Minister without Portfolio
Rt. Hon. Thomas Galbraith, Lord Strathclyde PC — Shadow Leader of the House of Lords
Rt. Hon. Eric Forth MP — Shadow Leader of the House of Commons and Shadow Chancellor of the Duchy of Lancaster
Hon. Bernard Jenkin MP — Shadow Secretary of State for Defence
David Willetts MP — Shadow Secretary of State for Work and Pensions
Dr. Liam Fox MP — Shadow Secretary of State for Health
Peter Ainsworth MP — Shadow Secretary of State for Environment, Food and Rural Affairs
Tim Yeo MP — Shadow Secretary of State for Culture, Media and Sport
Rt. Hon. Theresa May MP — Shadow Secretary of State for Transport, Local Government and the Regions
Quentin Davies MP — Shadow Secretary of State for Northern Ireland
John Whittingdale MP — Shadow Secretary of State for Trade and Industry
Damian Green MP — Shadow Secretary of State for Education and Skills
John Bercow MP — Shadow Chief Secretary to the Treasury
Jacqui Lait MP — Shadow Secretary of State for Scotland
Nigel Evans MP — Shadow Secretary of State for Wales
Caroline Spelman MP — Shadow Secretary of State for International Development
Rt. Hon. David Maclean MP — Opposition Chief Whip
Rt. Hon. John Cope, Lord Cope of Berkeley PC — Opposition Lords Chief Whip

Junior Shadow Ministers
Tim Collins CBE MP — Shadow Cabinet Office Minister
Eric Pickles MP — Shadow Transport Minister
David Lidington MP — Shadow Rural Affairs Minister
James Clappison MP — Shadow Work Minister
Bill Cash MP — Attorney General
Christopher Prout, Lord Kingsland QC — Shadow Lord Chancellor

Changes from 18 September 2001
Ann Winterton is sacked from the Shadow Ministerial Team
David Lidington enters the Shadow Ministerial Team as Shadow Rural Affairs Minister

IDS Shadow Cabinet reshuffle, 23 July 2002
Rt. Hon. Iain Duncan Smith MP — Leader of Her Majesty's Loyal Opposition and Leader of the Conservative Party
Rt. Hon. Michael Ancram QC MP — Deputy Leader of the Conservative Party and Shadow Secretary of State for Foreign and Commonwealth Affairs
Rt. Hon. Michael Howard QC MP — Shadow Chancellor of the Exchequer
Rt. Hon. Oliver Letwin MP — Shadow Secretary of State for the Home Department
Rt. Hon. Theresa May MP — Chairman of the Conservative Party
Rt. Hon. Thomas Galbraith, Lord Strathclyde PC — Shadow Leader of the House of Lords
Rt. Hon. Eric Forth MP — Shadow Leader of the House of Commons and Shadow Chancellor of the Duchy of Lancaster
Hon. Bernard Jenkin MP — Shadow Secretary of State for Defence
David Willetts MP — Shadow Secretary of State for Work and Pensions
Dr. Liam Fox MP — Shadow Secretary of State for Health
David Lidington MP — Shadow Secretary of State for Environment, Food and Rural Affairs
John Whittingdale MP — Shadow Secretary of State for Culture, Media and Sport
Rt. Hon. David Davis MP — Shadow Secretary of State for the Office of the Deputy Prime Minister
Quentin Davies MP — Shadow Secretary of State for Northern Ireland
Tim Yeo MP — Shadow Secretary of State for Trade and Industry
Damian Green MP — Shadow Secretary of State for Education and Skills
Howard Flight MP — Shadow Chief Secretary to the Treasury
Jacqui Lait MP — Shadow Secretary of State for Scotland
Nigel Evans MP — Shadow Secretary of State for Wales
Caroline Spelman MP — Shadow Secretary of State for International Development
Tim Collins CBE MP; Shadow Secretary of State for Transport
Eric Pickles MP — Secretary of State for Local Government and the Regions
Rt. Hon. David Maclean MP — Opposition Chief Whip
Rt. Hon. John Cope, Lord Cope of Berkeley PC — Opposition Lords Chief Whip

Junior Shadow Ministers
John Hayes MP — Shadow Rural Affairs Minister
James Clappison MP — Shadow Work Minister
Bill Cash MP — Shadow Attorney General
Christopher Prout, Lord Kingsland QC — Shadow Lord Chancellor

Changes from 3 May 2002
John Bercow leaves the Shadow Cabinet
Peter Ainsworth leaves the Shadow Cabinet
John Hayes enters the Shadow Ministerial Team as Shadow Rural Affairs Minister
Howard Flight enters the Shadow Cabinet as Shadow Chief Secretary to the Treasury
Owing to the resignation of Stephen Byers, the Department of Transport, Local Government and the Regions is divided between the new Secretary of State for Transport and the Office of the Deputy Prime Minister; Tim Collins CBE MP moves from Shadow Cabinet Office Minister to Shadow Secretary of State for Transport
John Whittingdale moves from Shadow Secretary of State for Trade and Industry to Shadow Secretary of State for Culture, Media and Sport
Tim Yeo moves from Shadow Secretary of State for Culture, Media and Sport to Shadow Secretary of State for Trade and Industry
Theresa May moves from Shadow Secretary of State for Transport, Local Government and the Regions to Chairman of the Conservative Party
David Davis is moved from Chairman of the Conservative Party to become Shadow Secretary of State for the Office of the Deputy Prime Minister
David Lidington moves from Shadow Rural Affairs Minister to Shadow Secretary of State for Environment, Food and Rural Affairs

IDS Shadow Cabinet reshuffle, 1 July 2003
Rt. Hon. Iain Duncan Smith MP — Leader of Her Majesty's Loyal Opposition and Leader of the Conservative Party
Rt. Hon. Michael Ancram QC MP — Deputy Leader of the Conservative Party and Shadow Secretary of State for Foreign and Commonwealth Affairs
Rt. Hon. Michael Howard QC MP — Shadow Chancellor of the Exchequer
Rt. Hon. Oliver Letwin MP — Shadow Secretary of State for the Home Department
Rt. Hon. Theresa May MP — Chairman of the Conservative Party
Rt. Hon. Thomas Galbraith, Lord Strathclyde PC — Shadow Leader of the House of Lords
Rt. Hon. Eric Forth MP — Shadow Leader of the House of Commons and Shadow Chancellor of the Duchy of Lancaster
Hon. Bernard Jenkin MP — Shadow Secretary of State for Defence
David Willetts MP — Shadow Secretary of State for Work and Pensions
Dr. Liam Fox MP — Shadow Secretary of State for Health
David Lidington MP — Shadow Secretary of State for Environment, Food and Rural Affairs
John Whittingdale MP — Shadow Secretary of State for Culture, Media and Sport
Rt. Hon. David Davis MP — Shadow Secretary of State for the Office of the Deputy Prime Minister
Quentin Davies MP — Shadow Secretary of State for Northern Ireland
Tim Yeo MP — Shadow Secretary of State for Trade and Industry
Damian Green MP — Shadow Secretary of State for Education and Skills
Howard Flight MP — Shadow Chief Secretary to the Treasury
Jacqui Lait MP — Shadow Secretary of State for Scotland
Nigel Evans MP — Shadow Secretary of State for Wales
Caroline Spelman MP — Shadow Secretary of State for International Development
Tim Collins CBE MP; Shadow Secretary of State for Transport
Eric Pickles MP — Shadow Secretary of State for Local Government and the Regions
Rt. Hon. David Maclean MP — Opposition Chief Whip
Rt. Hon. John Cope, Lord Cope of Berkeley PC — Opposition Lords Chief Whip

Junior Shadow Ministers
John Hayes MP — Shadow Rural Affairs Minister
James Clappison MP — Shadow Work Minister
Bill Cash MP — Shadow Attorney General and Shadow Secretary of State for Constitutional Affairs
Christopher Prout, Lord Kingsland QC — Shadow Lord Chancellor
Patick Mercer OBE MP — Shadow Homeland Security Minister

Changes from 23 July 2002
Patrick Mercer becomes the newly created Shadow Homeland Security Minister

See also

Conservative Party (UK)-related lists
Official Opposition (United Kingdom)
Shadow Cabinet
2001 establishments in the United Kingdom
2003 disestablishments in the United Kingdom
British shadow cabinets
2001 in British politics